Thomas O'Neill was a member of the Wisconsin State Assembly.

Biography
O'Neill was born on June 21, 1821 in Dublin, Ireland. He settled in what is now the City of Greenfield, Wisconsin in 1847. On February 12, 1874, in Milwaukee, he married Mary Reynolds, in a Catholic ceremony at St Gall's Church.

Career
O'Neill was a member of the Wisconsin State Assembly during the 1875  session.

References

19th-century Irish people
Politicians from Dublin (city)
Irish emigrants to the United States (before 1923)
People from Greenfield, Wisconsin
Republican Party members of the Wisconsin State Assembly
City and town clerks
1821 births
Year of death missing